The 2013–14 Long Beach State 49ers men's basketball team represented California State University, Long Beach during the 2013–14 NCAA Division I men's basketball season. The 49ers were led by seventh year head coach Dan Monson and played their home games at Walter Pyramid and were members of the Big West Conference. They finished the season 15–17, 10–6 in Big West play to finish in third place. They advanced to the semifinals of the Big West Conference tournament where they lost to Cal State Northridge.

Roster

Schedule

|-
!colspan=9 style=| Regular season

|-
!colspan=9 style=| Big West tournament

References

Long Beach State Beach men's basketball seasons
Long Beach
Long Beach State 49ers men's basketball
Long Beach State 49ers men's basketball